Sayhuite (Sigh-weetey) is an archaeological site  east of the city Abancay, about 3 hours away from the city of Cusco, in the province Abancay in the region Apurímac in Peru. The site is regarded as a center of religious worship for Inca people, focusing on water. In the Monuments of the Inca by John Hemming, Hemming points to a colonial narrative that describes the interior of the Sayhuite temple. The temple featured larger columns draped in fabrics with gold bands the "thickness of one's hand." The temple was also under the care of the priestess Asarpay, who jumped to her death in the nearby 400 meter gorge to avoid capture by Spanish forces.

Monolith
An important feature on the site is the Sayhuite monolith, an enormous rock containing more than 200 geometric and zoomorphic figures, including reptiles, frogs, and felines. Found at the top of a hill named Concacha, the stone was sculpted as a topographical hydraulic model, complete with terraces, ponds, rivers, tunnels, and irrigation channels. The functions or purposes of the stone are not known, but researcher Dr. Arlan Andrews, Sr.  believes the monolith was used as a scale model to design, develop, test, and document the water flow for public water projects, and to teach ancient engineers and technicians the concepts and practices required. The rock was "edited" several times, with new material, either altering the paths of the water or adding routes altogether. About two meters long, and four meters wide, the monolith is the most popular attraction on the archaeological site.

Significance of the Monolith 
While the creators remain a mystery,  the monolith provides archaeologists with insight into the culture of the pre-Columbian population. Archaeologists have determined that the site was an Incan religious center, where rituals and ceremonies for the worship of water was conducted. The monolith is an important clue to this, since it depicts a water-like flow between the carvings. Archaeologist Gary Urton states that "Carvings in its upper part represent terraces, irrigation canals, pumas, and other animals, such as lizards." and that it may be a symbolic representation of the valley. While the precise meaning of this stone remains unsolved, the monolith is part of the material culture of the Incan people, and as such helps archaeologists piece together how and why they lived this way.  Understanding the Incan culture from an archaeological perspective helps archaeologists apply this knowledge to similar civilizations and find links between ancient cultures.

Tourism 
Because of its size and intricate carvings, the monolith is a popular site for tourists.  A possible explanation of the intricate carvings is that the stone depicts a religious ritual, possibly associated with water, that the ancient Incas performed. Encouraging tourists to examine this monolith is important, since it raises the awareness about the archaeological record and the importance preservating material culture.

Importance of Preservation 
Preserving the site of Sayhuite and the monolith is crucial, because archaeology is a destructive process.  In addition, looting is a common problem at archaeological sites and can hinder the analysis performed by archaeologists of past peoples and culture.  Preserving the archaeological site of Sayhuite includes leaving parts of the site unexcavated and protecting the monolith from vandalism and erosion.  To protect the archaeological site from vandalism and looting, education of the general public is crucial.  This creates ways for the public to get involved in a significant part of history and raises awareness for the importance of preservation in the field of archaeology. Preserving the site allows for a chance for new technological advances, which would aid in archaeologists’ study of the site and could possibly help them understand the meaning of the monolith to a greater extent and with more accuracy.

References

Archaeology of Peru
Archaeological sites in Apurímac Region
Archaeological sites in Peru